Doi Lo is a district (amphoe) of Chiang Mai province in northern Thailand.

Geography
Neighboring districts are (from the southwest clockwise) Chom Thong, Mae Wang, San Pa Tong of Chiang Mai Province, Pa Sang and Wiang Nong Long of Lamphun province.

History
The minor district (king amphoe) was established on 1 April 1995, when four tambons were split off from Chom Thong.

On 15 May 2007, all 81 minor districts were upgraded to full districts. On 24 August the upgrade became official.

Administration
The district is divided into four sub-districts (tambon), which are further subdivided into 54 villages (muban). There are no municipal (thesaban) areas, and four tambon administrative organizations (TAO).

References

External links
amphoe.com

Doi Lo